The coat of arms of Sunderland is the official heraldic arms of the City of Sunderland.

The Sunderland Corporation first assumed a heraldic device in the 19th century. The first grant of arms was made in 1947, and this was not amended in 1967 when additional territory was incorporated into the County Borough of Sunderland.

In 1974, on the creation of the Metropolitan Borough of Sunderland, new arms were granted essentially the old arms with amendments to reflect the new incorporated areas, and in 1992 when Sunderland was created a City an entirely new grant of arms was made, the main charges being quite unlike any previous grant.

Motto 

Sunderland has used Nil desperandum Auspice Deo ("When God is on our side there is no cause for despair." or "Do not despair, have faith in God" or "Don’t despair, in God we trust")  as a motto since 1849.  It is taken from the Odes of Horace, Book 1, Ode 7, line 27.

1849-1949

1949-1974 

Argent a sextant Sable on a chief Azure two keys wards upwards and outwards in saltire Argent between as many mitres of the last, both enfiled with a ducal coronet Or

For crest: On a wreath Argent and Azure a lymphad Sable, the sail Azure charged with the cross of St Cuthbert Argent flying flags Argent charged with a cross Gules.

For supporters: On a mount Or, on either side a lion Argent that on the dexter side supporting  an anchor and the sinister a pickaxe.

As a motto: Nil desperandum auspice Deo

1967

1974-1992

1992-to date 

Although the grant of 1974 was made to the Council of the Borough of Sunderland and its successors regardless of their names, elevation to city status in 1992 was celebrated with a new grant of arms, which city officials requested had "not as much white" as previous arms.

Azure between in Chief and in Base a Bar wavy Argent charged with a like Barrulet Azure a Crown flory Or the circlet charged with four Saltires couped Gules

For crest:
Upon a Helm with a Wreath Or and Azure upon Water barry wavy Azure Argent Azure a Lymphad with oars in action proper each Castle charged with two Crosses of Saint Cuthbert (one manifest) Or a sail of the Arms pennon and flags Gules Mantled Azure doubled Or.

For supporters:
On the Dexter  side a lion Or, armed and langued Gules gorged with a collar argent fimbriated Sable charged with six ears of wheat  proper(three manifest), dependent therefrom a Roundel per bend wavy Or and Azure charged with a Cross pommy Gules entwined by an Orle Argent  standing on an Anchor the flukes inward Or and on the Sinister side a Lion Azure armed and langued Gules gorged with a collar Argent  fimbriated Gules charged with six mullets also Gules (three manifest) dependent therefrom a Roundel per bend wavy Or and Azure charged with a Boar's Head close couped Gules armed Or standing on a Miner's Pick ward Or the head turned inwards also Gold

The badge an Estoile Gules charged with a Crown Flory Or the circlet charged with four Saltires couped Gules has five arms to represent the new and tradition industries now in the city.

The motto, Nil desperandum auspice Deo, has traditionally been used by Sunderland.

Sunderland gained city status in the fortieth year of Queen Elizabeth's reign, and each saltire supposedly represents ten years of that reign.  However, in the definitive painting, on the letters patent, the each crown has two and two half-saltires visible.  Usually this implies another two and two half-saltires on the invisible half of the circlet.  When used by the council the crowns have four full saltires visible.  Although the traditional sextant, as a reminder of Sunderland's shipping history has been lost, the supporters and crest still retain the reminders of the inland areas of the city.

Sources
 Civic Heraldry: Sunderland Metropolitan Borough Council
 Civic Heraldry: Sunderland County Borough Council
 Civic Heraldry: Sunderland City Council

Sunderland
City of Sunderland
Coats of arms of metropolitan district councils of England
Sunderland
Sunderland
Sunderland
Sunderland
Sunderland
Sunderland
Sunderland
Sunderland